The 1958–59 season was the 60th completed season of The Football League.

This season saw the introduction of the Fourth Division.

Final league tables

The tables below are reproduced here in the exact form that they can be found at The Rec.Sport.Soccer Statistics Foundation website and in Rothmans Book of Football League Records 1888–89 to 1978–79, with home and away statistics separated.

Beginning with the season 1894–95, clubs finishing level on points were separated according to goal average (goals scored divided by goals conceded), or more properly put, goal ratio. The goal average system was eventually scrapped beginning with the 1976–77 season.

From this season, the bottom four teams of the Fourth Division were required to apply for re-election.

First Division

Results

Maps

Second Division

Results

Maps

Third Division

Results

Maps

Fourth Division

Results

Maps

See also
 1958-59 in English football

References

Ian Laschke: Rothmans Book of Football League Records 1888–89 to 1978–79. Macdonald and Jane's, London & Sydney, 1980.

English Football League seasons
Eng
1958–59 in English football leagues